Zinc finger protein 426 is a protein that in humans is encoded by the ZNF426 gene.

Function

Kaposi's sarcoma-associated herpesvirus (KSHV) can be reactivated from latency by the viral protein RTA. The protein encoded by this gene is a zinc finger transcriptional repressor that interacts with RTA to modulate RTA-mediated reactivation of KSHV. While the encoded protein can repress KSHV reactivation, RTA can induce degradation of this protein through the ubiquitin-proteasome pathway to overcome the repression. Several transcript variants encoding different isoforms have been found for this gene.

References

Further reading 

Molecular biology
Proteins
Proteomics